The 2001–02 Coupe de la Ligue began on 1 September 2001 and the final took place on 20 April 2002 at the Stade de France. Lyon were the defending champions, but were knocked-out by Bordeaux in the Round of 16. Bordeaux went on to win the tournament, beating Lorient 3–0 in the final.

First round
The matches were played on 1 September 2001.
 Le Havre AC 2–1 ES Wasquehal
 FC Martigues 3–0  Toulouse FC
 Le Mans Union Club 72 2–1 OGC Nice
 Stade Lavallois 1–0  AS Beauvais
 AS Saint-Etienne 2–0  FC Gueugnon
 Amiens SC 2-1 SCO Angers
 AC Ajaccio 0–0 Nîmes Olympique (aet, pen 3–4)
 US Créteil 4–2 ASOA Valence
 AS Cannes 1–0  Grenoble Foot 38
 CS Louhans-Cuiseaux 2–0  FC Istres
 RC Strasbourg 3–0  Chamois Niortais FC

Round of 32
The matches were played on 1 and 2 December 2001.
Olympique Lyonnais 1–1 FC Sochaux (aet, pen 4–3)
FC Lorient 5–4 FC Metz
FC Nantes 3–2 CS Sedan (aet)
Le Mans Union Club 72 2–3 SC Bastia
Stade Rennais 3–1 US Créteil
LOSC 0–2 ASNL
En Avant de Guingamp 4–0 AS Saint-Etienne
Stade Lavallois 0–3 AJ Auxerre
AS Cannes 1–2 Girondins de Bordeaux
Amiens SC 2–0 Nîmes Olympique
CS Louhans-Cuiseaux 0–1 Le Havre AC
RC Strasbourg 2–0 SM Caen
LB Châteauroux 2- 1 FC Martigues
AS Monaco 4–1 RC Lens
Troyes AC 0–4 Paris Saint-Germain
Olympique de Marseille 0–0  Montpellier HSC (aet, p. 4–2)

Round of 16
The matches were played on 8, 9 and 16 January 2002.
Stade Rennais 2–0 Le Havre AC
FC Nantes 1–3 SC Bastia
Amiens SC 0–2 RC Strasbourg
Paris Saint-Germain 3–1 En Avant de Guingamp
Girondins de Bordeaux 1–1 Olympique Lyonnais (aet, p. 4–2)
FC Lorient 1–0 AJ Auxerre
AS Monaco 2–1 Olympique de Marseille
ASNL 3–2 LB Châteauroux

Quarter-finals
The matches were played on 26 and 27 January 2002.
Girondins de Bordeaux 2–1 AS Monaco
Stade Rennais 3–2 RC Strasbourg
FC Lorient 1–1 SC Bastia (aet, pen 4–2)
Paris Saint-Germain 1–1 ASNL (aet, pen 4–3)

Semi-finals
The matches were played on 2 and 3 March 2002.
Paris Saint-Germain 0–1 Girondins de Bordeaux
FC Lorient 1–0 Stade Rennais

Final

The final was played on 20 April 2002 at the Stade de France.

Topscorer
Danijel Ljuboja (5 goals)

External links
Coupe de La Ligue Ligue de Football Professionnel 

Coupe de la Ligue seasons
France
League Cup